Luzás is a locality located in the municipality of Tolva, in Huesca province, Aragon, Spain. As of 2020, it has a population of 13.

Geography 
Luzás is located 107km east of Huesca.

References

Populated places in the Province of Huesca